Rancho Paso de Bartolo also called Rancho Paso de Bartolo Viejo was a  Mexican land grant in present-day Los Angeles County, California given in 1835 by Governor Jose Figueroa to Juan Crispin Perez.  The name refers to a San Gabriel River ford called Paso de Bartolo Viejo (Old Bartolo's Crossing). The rancho includes present-day Montebello, Whittier, and Pico Rivera.

History
Initially property of the San Gabriel Mission, the Rancho Paso de Bartolo land became a part of the original  Rancho Los Nietos grant. Following secularization of the missions, Rancho Paso de Bartolo was granted in 1835 to Juan Crispin Perez, a manager at the mission.

In 1843, Bernardo Guirado, a worker at the mission, acquired  of Paso de Bartolo from Perez.  Later, Joaquina Ana Sepulveda, widow of Juan de Jesus Poyorena acquired another .  In 1847, Juan Crispin Perez died leaving the rancho to his family.  After the Mexican-American War, former Governor Pío Pico began purchasing pieces of the estate from the heirs of Perez, and by 1852, he acquired  of the rancho.

With the cession of California to the United States following the Mexican-American War, the 1848 Treaty of Guadalupe Hidalgo provided that the land grants would be honored. As required by the Land Act of 1851, a claim for Rancho Paso de Bartolo was filed with the Public Land Commission in 1852.

There was some legal dispute over the Guirado and Sepulveda land, and with the possible encroachment on the Rancho Santa Gertrudes grant to the south.

Historic sites of the Rancho
Pio Pico State Historic Park.  Pío Pico lived at "El Ranchito" from 1852 to 1892.  An adobe home was destroyed by the floods of 1883-1884. His second adobe casa, now known as Pío Pico Mansion, represents a compromise between Mexican and American cultures.
The Battle of Rio San Gabriel, one of the last battles of the Mexican-American War, was fought on Rancho Paso de Bartolo on January 8, 1847.

See also
 Ranchos of California
 List of Ranchos of California 
 Whittier Narrows

References

  

Paso de Bartolo
Paso de Bartolo
Montebello, California
Pico Rivera, California
Whittier, California